Frontier lands are Crown owned lands in Canada's North and offshore areas not under the jurisdiction of a federal or provincial shared management agreement.

References

Northern Canada